Muneir Al-Masri (born 17 March 1963) is a Jordanian wrestler. He competed in two events at the 1988 Summer Olympics.

References

1963 births
Living people
Jordanian male sport wrestlers
Olympic wrestlers of Jordan
Wrestlers at the 1988 Summer Olympics
Place of birth missing (living people)
20th-century Jordanian people